Adalbus crassicornis is a species of longhorn beetle in the Cerambycinae subfamily, and the only species in the genus Adalbus. It was described by Fairmaire and Germain in 1859. It is known from Chile and western Argentina. Its host plants are Nothofagus pumilio, Nothofagus dombeyi, Nothofagus antarctica, and Nothofagus alpina. Specimens have been collected in regions where the Chilean pine grows, including Cordillera de Nahuelbuta, Cherquenco, and Caramávida.

References

External links
Adalbus crassicornis images at New World Cerambycidae Catalog.

Bimiini
Beetles described in 1859
Monotypic Cerambycidae genera